Unsane is a 2018 American psychological horror film directed by Steven Soderbergh and written by Jonathan Bernstein and James Greer. The film stars Claire Foy, Joshua Leonard, Jay Pharoah, Matt Damon, Juno Temple, Aimee Mullins, and Amy Irving, and follows a woman confined to a mental institution after she is pursued by a stalker. The film was shot entirely on the iPhone 7 Plus.

Unsane had its world premiere at the Berlin International Film Festival on February 21, 2018, and was theatrically released in the United States on March 23, 2018, by Soderbergh's production company Fingerprint Releasing and Bleecker Street. The film was a commercial success, grossing over $14 million on a budget of $1.5 million. It received generally positive reviews from critics, who mainly praised the performances, direction, cinematography and production values.

Plot
Sawyer Valentini is a woman who moves away from her home in Boston to escape a stalker. However, she is still traumatized, having a brief reaction while on a date. She talks with a counselor at Highland Creek Behavioral Center, unknowingly signing a consent form for voluntary 24-hour admission to a locked psychiatric hospital. She calls the police but they do nothing when they see the signed form. During the night, stress causes Sawyer to lash out through physical altercations with a patient and a staff member. As a result, the staff psychiatrist retains her for seven more days.

Another patient, Nate Hoffman, reveals to Sawyer that Highland Creek is running a scheme to milk health insurance claims for profit. They trick people into voluntarily committing themselves as long as the patients' insurance companies continue to pay; when insurance claims run out, the patient is "cured" and released. One day, Sawyer sees David Strine, her stalker, working as an orderly under the pseudonym George Shaw.

Nate has a secret cellphone, and Sawyer uses it to call her mother, Angela, who attempts to get her out; Sawyer reveals to her mother about having been stalked, and explains that David is at the hospital. David intentionally gives Sawyer a large dose of methylphenidate, causing her to appear insane. That evening, he convinces Angela, who had never seen him before, that he is a hotel employee, and kills her.

David feels threatened with Sawyer and Nate together, knocking Nate unconscious and secretly torturing him with a defibrillator before killing him with an overdose of fentanyl. Sawyer finds Nate's phone under her pillow, with images of Nate badly beaten. She alerts the staff, who dismiss and put her in solitary confinement. David visits Sawyer and says he has a secluded mountain cabin he wants to take Sawyer to. Sawyer mocks him for his inexperience with women. David later returns and reveals he faked that Sawyer's insurance ran out, changing her status to released. At a forest, the body of the real George Shaw is found.

Looking for a way out, Sawyer feigns concern that David is a virgin, and that she does not want to be his first. She convinces David to have sex with another woman to prove that he will only want Sawyer after losing his virginity. Sawyer suggests Violet, another patient who previously threatened Sawyer with a shank, and he brings her to the solitary confinement cell. Sawyer uses Violet's shank to stab David in the neck and flees as he kills Violet. He recaptures Sawyer outside, and she wakes up in the trunk of his car next to her mother's corpse.

Sawyer jumps from the trunk of the moving car and flees into the woods with David in pursuit. David catches Sawyer and breaks her ankle with a hammer. She stabs him in the eye with Angela's cross and slashes his throat with the shank. Meanwhile, it is revealed that Nate was an undercover investigative journalist sent to investigate Highland Creek. Police execute a warrant on the center and arrest the hospital administrator. Six months later, while at lunch, Sawyer thinks she sees David sitting in the restaurant. She approaches him with a knife, but upon realizing it is not him drops the knife and runs away in a panic.

Cast

Production
In July 2017, it was announced Steven Soderbergh had shot a film in secret, in June 2017, starring Claire Foy and Juno Temple. The film was shot on an iPhone 7 Plus in 4K using the app FiLMiC Pro, and was released through Soderbergh's Fingerprint Releasing banner. In August 2017, Jay Pharoah confirmed that he was a co-star in the film.

Release
The film had its world premiere at the Berlin International Film Festival on February 21, 2018. and was released in the United States on March 23, 2018.

Reception

Box office
Unsane has grossed $7.7 million in the United States and Canada, and $6.5 million in other territories, for a worldwide total of $14.2 million.

In the United States and Canada, Unsane was released alongside Pacific Rim Uprising, Midnight Sun, Sherlock Gnomes and Paul, Apostle of Christ, and was projected to gross $3 million from 2,023 theaters in its opening weekend. It ended up debuting to $3.7 million, finishing 11th at the box office. In its second weekend the film made $1.4 million, a 61.6% drop.

Critical response
The website's critical consensus reads, "Unsane unleashes Steven Soderbergh's inner B-movie maestro, wading into timeless psychological thriller territory and giving it a high-tech filmmaking spin." On Metacritic, the film has a weighted average score of 63 out of 100, based on 45 critics, indicating "generally favorable reviews." Audiences polled by CinemaScore gave the film an average grade of "B−" on an A+ to F scale.

Richard Brody from The New Yorker wrote "Above all, [Soderbergh] revels, with palpable joy, in his repertory of distorted, disturbing, lurid yet lucid images, making a furious movie that signifies nothing but the irrepressible vitality of the cinema itself. Soderbergh's experiment is a success." Justin Chang of the Los Angeles Times wrote, "Soderbergh is one of the most dexterous directors working in the American mainstream, and he has a sly talent for lacing even a seemingly disposable genre offering with smart, incisive ideas."

See also 
 Involuntary commitment

References

External links
 

2018 horror films
2010s psychological horror films
20th Century Fox films
American psychological drama films
American psychological horror films
American LGBT-related films
Bleecker Street films
Lesbian-related films
LGBT-related thriller films
Films shot in New York (state)
Films about psychiatry
Films about stalking
Films about post-traumatic stress disorder
Films about self-harm
Films directed by Steven Soderbergh
Films set in psychiatric hospitals
Mobile phone films
Regency Enterprises films
2010s English-language films
2010s American films